Bob Grant may refer to:

Bob Grant (radio host) (1929–2013), New York City radio personality
Bob Grant (actor) (1932–2003), British television comedy actor
Bob Grant (athlete) (1934–2007), Australian Olympic athlete
Bob Grant (rugby league) (born 1946), Australian rugby league footballer
Bob Grant (American football) (born 1946), American football player
Bobby Grant (Brookside), character in the British soap opera Brookside
Bobby Grant (footballer, born 1990), English footballer for Oldham Athletic
Bobby Grant (footballer, born 1940) (1940–2017), Scottish footballer
Bobby Grant (born 1996), born-American Italian athlete

See also
Robert Grant (disambiguation)